James Zug (born 1969) is an American writer. He is the author of six books.

Life
He was born and raised in Philadelphia, Pennsylvania. He has written for national magazines and newspapers, as well as for publications in Africa, the Middle East and Europe. He has written for The Daily Beast and for a time had a weekly blog on squash, the game, for Vanity Fair's online edition. A former reader at The Paris Review, he is a senior writer at Squash Magazine.

Zug has written an obituary on a South African communist; a review of a travel book on Siberia; a magazine article on the last player of an obscure racquet sport; an essay on Quaker education; an appreciation for Doris Lessing's forgotten first novel; and an interview with a groundhog handler in Punxsutawney, Pennsylvania. His latest book is about a coach who has overcome tremendous adversity to lead his team to the all-time collegiate record for consecutive win streaks.

His fiction has appeared in the anthology Stress City: A Big Book of Fiction By 51 DC Guys (Paycock Press, 2008) . He also appeared in South Africa's Resistance Press: Alternative Voices in the Last Generation Under Apartheid (Ohio University, 2000) .

He lives in Wilmington, Delaware, with his wife.

Works
 Squash: A History of the Game (Scribner, 2003) 
 The Preserve (privately printed, 2004)
 American Traveler: The Life & Adventures of John Ledyard (Basic Books, 2005) 
 The Last Voyage of Captain Cook: The Collected Writings of John Ledyard (editor; National Geographic Society) 
 The Guardian: The History of South Africa's Extraordinary Anti-Apartheid Newspaper (Michigan State University Press and the University of South Africa Press, 2007) 
 The Long Conversation: 125 Years of Sidwell Friends School (privately printed, 2008)  
 Run to the Roar: Coaching to Overcome Fear (with Paul Assaiante; Penguin, 2010).

Awards

 George Plimpton Award, United States Court Tennis Association, 2003
 Bronze Medal, Independent Book Publishers Award, 2008

References

External links
 Official website
 Run to The Roar website
 Profile in The Northwest Current (Washington, DC) 
 Interview on New Books in History

Living people
Writers from Philadelphia
1969 births
Dartmouth College alumni
Columbia University School of the Arts alumni